Sidi Bouzid Governorate, sometimes spelt Sidi Bou Zid, is one of the 24 governorates (provinces) of Tunisia. It is in central Tunisia and landlocked. It covers an area of 7405 km2 and has a population of 429,912 (2014 census). The capital is its most populous settlement, Sidi Bouzid.

Geography
Toward the east and south of the governorate feature narrow escarpments of the dorsal Atlas Mountains and the western border is elevated.  The land otherwise slopes generally east throughout.  Lakes are scarce relative to other northern and central divisions.  A dammed lake, the Barrage Sidi Saad, commences on the northern border with Kairouan Governorate; within the administrative area its principal effect is to widen the main river, the Oued El Hatech which rises close to the Algerian border on the far west side of neighbouring Kasserine Governorate.  The river adjoins fields on the northern edge of the town of Sidi Bouzid.  A larger seasonal salt lake, the Sebkhet en Noual is largely within the area and on the south-east border.  It is described on some maps as a salt marsh. The smaller maximum-size Sebkhet Mecheguia forms a short part of the eastern border.  The natural landscape is semi-arid with irrigated areas used for cultivation and grazing.  The climate is therefore temperate at night, except in unusual overcast conditions and precipitation is confined largely to winter months/early spring, its levels are variable, see Climate.

Administrative divisions
The following cities and towns are located in the governorate:
 Bir El Hafey
 Cebbala Ouled Asker
 Jilma
 Menzel Bouzaiane
 Meknassy
 Mezzouna
 Ouled Haffouz
 Regueb
 Sidi Ali Ben Aoun
 Sidi Bouzid (capital)

References

 
Governorates of Tunisia